Fight the Frequency is the fourth studio album by American rock band American Hi-Fi, released on August 17, 2010.  Work on the album began in May 2007, when the band first entered the studio to record a follow-up to Hearts on Parade. But due to label issues and band members Stacy Jones and Jamie Arentzen touring as part of Miley Cyrus' backing band, the record's planned release for May 2009 was delayed until 2010. This is the first album to feature original drummer Brian Nolan since their 2003 album The Art of Losing. The album has been produced by the band themselves through their self-made label "Hi-Fi Killers".

Track listing

Personnel
Stacy Jones - lead vocals, rhythm guitar, drums
Jamie Arentzen - lead guitar, backing vocals
Drew Parsons - bass, backing vocals
Brian Nolan - drums, backing vocals

Production
Greg Collins - engineer, keyboard, mixing
Stevie Blacke - strings
Jessica Catron - cello
Paul Hager - mixing
Bill Lefler - engineer
Dave McNair - mastering
Miles Wilson - engineer

Singles
"Lost" was the first and only single from the album. The video features the famous British model Keeley Hazell. Stacy Jones said that they did not do the video for the story line, just had fun with it.

References

External links
http://www.allmusic.com/album/fight-the-frequency-mw0001996595

American Hi-Fi albums
2010 albums